Jean-François Quintin (born May 28, 1969) is a Canadian former professional ice hockey player. Quintin played for the San Jose Sharks of the National Hockey League between 1991 and 1993 and several minor league teams during his career, which lasted from 1989 to 2003.

Playing career
Quintin was born in Saint-Jean-sur-Richelieu, Quebec. As a youth, he played in the 1981 Quebec International Pee-Wee Hockey Tournament with a minor ice hockey team from Saint-Jean-sur-Richelieu.

Quintin was drafted in the 1989 NHL Entry Draft, fourth round, 75th overall, by the Minnesota North Stars. His NHL career was brief, playing for the San Jose Sharks in only eight games in 1991–92 and 14 more in 1992–93. In those 22 games, he scored 5 goals and added 5 assists for 10 points.

Career statistics

Regular season and playoffs

References

External links
 

1969 births
Living people
Canadian expatriate ice hockey players in Germany
Canadian expatriate ice hockey players in Slovenia
Canadian ice hockey left wingers
DEG Metro Stars players
Essen Mosquitoes players
French Quebecers
HDD Olimpija Ljubljana players
Ice hockey people from Quebec
Kalamazoo Wings (1974–2000) players
Kansas City Blades players
Minnesota North Stars draft picks
People from Saint-Jean-sur-Richelieu
San Jose Sharks players
Shawinigan Cataractes players
Starbulls Rosenheim players